Paradise Kiss, also abbreviated to ParaKiss, is a josei manga series written and illustrated by Ai Yazawa. It appeared as a serial in the Japanese fashion magazine Zipper. Shodensha collected the chapters into five volumes. The series has also been adapted into a 12-episode anime series, produced by Aniplex and Studio Madhouse, and aired in Japan on Fuji TV's Noitamina programming block and on the anime television network Animax, which broadcast the series worldwide, including in Japan, Southeast Asia, South Asia and East Asia.

The comic and the anime have become popular both domestically and internationally. They have been translated and dubbed or subtitled in many languages, including Vietnamese, Chinese (Taiwan), Korean, Finnish, French, Italian, Polish, Thai, German, Spanish, Portuguese, Cantonese (Hong Kong) and English. The English version was published by Vertical, Inc.

Paradise Kiss occurs in the same universe as Yazawa's previous work, Neighborhood Story. However, Paradise Kiss is a stand-alone story, as only three supporting characters from Neighborhood Story have major roles.

Characters 
 
 
 Portrayed by: Keiko Kitagawa, Sea Kumada (childhood)
 Yukari is a beautiful but arrogant high school senior that studies dutifully for her university entrance exams. She cannot find meaning in her straight-laced life of exams and feels that she has not truly lived at all. As a student at a prestigious high school, she begins with a snobbish attitude towards the fashion design students, looking down on them for being so radically different. After she is scouted by Arashi and "kidnapped" by Isabella to the Atelier, her attitude towards them begins to change to one of admiration for the students' passion and courage to be themselves. Her intense relationship with George pushes her to pursue her own identity, continuing to encourage her to assert herself despite the fact that she feels he is a cold and manipulative man. The members of ParaKiss support her as she discovers new depths to her own ambitions by embarking on a professional fashion career, including the experience of being represented by an agency. She is often inexplicably referred to as "Caroline" or "Carrie" by the members of Paradise. In the manga, she eventually marries Hiroyuki after George leaves to pursue fashion design in Paris. In the anime, she marries an unnamed boyfriend assumed to be Hiroyuki. In the live-action film, she rejects Hiroyuki and finds George again while on a modelling job in New York.

 
 
 Portrayed by: Osamu Mukai
 George is a senior at Yazagaku fashion school with a gift for fashion design, particularly in haute couture. Although his personality can appear cold, he lives like a hedonist and has extravagant ideas on everything, most of which are not accepted by the mainstream. George is bisexual and explains himself as an "equal opportunity lover". He refers to Yukari as both his muse and a tease. He wishes for her to become an independent woman that makes her own decisions and takes responsibility for them. His appearance is loosely based on Brian Slade of Velvet Goldmine, several references to the film are made by him in the manga. Yukari humorously questions if he is actually an alien because of his distinctive blue hair and eyes. The lifestyle that he lives is that of a wealthy young bachelor; he lives in a high-end loft and drives a vintage Jaguar. This lifestyle and his tuition are both paid for by George's wealthy father, but because his mother was merely a mistress, he rarely sees him. His mother often complains that despite his ill will towards his father, he looks and acts just like him. In the end, he's sad to leave Yukari behind but goes with Isabella to Paris to pursue fashion design.

 
 
 Portrayed by: Aya Omasa
Miwako is the bubbly, pink-haired student of Yazagaku who works with George to run their brand, Paradise Kiss. She is the younger sister of the Happy Berry brand's creator/president, Mikako Kouda, who is the protagonist in Ai Yazawa's Gokinjo Monogatari work, and feels pressure to live up to her success. Miwako tends to act in a rather childlike manner, both in her Lolita style dress and unique vocabulary. She carries around a jar of konpeito candy that makes her feel better by reminding her of how she is loved. Because of her cute personality, she is adored by many of the characters and becomes Yukari's closest friend, even offering her a place to stay when she needs it. Unbeknownst to Yukari, Miwako was a childhood friend of Hiroyuki and his first love.

 
 
 Portrayed by: Kento Kaku
Arashi is a student of Yazagaku with a taste for punk style and alternative music. With his distressed jeans and safety pin piercings, Yukari flees when he tries to scout her in the streets of Tokyo. George enjoys harassing the serious-minded punk. Miwako reassures her that though Arashi looks intimidating, he is very kind. He is Miwako's childhood friend turned boyfriend, and this was the cause of the split in friendship between Miwako and Hiroyuki, having told Miwako that she could no longer see him anymore. Arashi despises being compared to Hiroyuki for any reason as he secretly believes himself to be inferior to the clean-cut prodigy. He even breaks Miwako's phone when he realizes she is texting Hiroyuki. By the end of the manga, Hiroyuki and Miwako help him to get over his inferiority complex, and the three childhood friends attend a New Year's celebration together. When the members of ParaKiss engage in outrageous behavior, Arashi is usually the voice of reason. He is the one that talks most directly to Yukari about her decision to drop out of school. He is the son of a musician, Risa Kanzaki, who is a good friend of Mikako Kouda. (Both characters appear in Gokinjo Monogatari.) Arashi and Miwako eventually marry and have a daughter who looks much like Arashi (whom Hiroyuki believes would look cuter if she had looked like Miwako instead).

 
 
 Portrayed by: Shunji Igarashi
Isabella is the mother figure to the members of ParaKiss. This tall Yazagaku student is the epitome of high class and femininity. Isabella was born into a wealthy family and was the inspiration for George's very first dress during childhood, becoming his first client. She often had the habit of taking every piece of clothing that he finished. As a child, she had always wanted gorgeous dresses, and George was the one that fulfilled her wish. Isabella provides a source of support to Yukari when she needs it the most, whether it be regarding her relationship with George or choice to abandon her studies. Isabella is a transgender woman and she is mortified when anyone refers to her as her birth name.

 
 
 Portrayed by: Yusuke Yamamoto
Yukari's classmate, an intelligent and handsome prodigy who is the object of Yukari's affections at the beginning of the story. Hiroyuki was once in love with Miwako, but Arashi forbade her from seeing him. He gives advice to Arashi on how to come to terms with his feelings for Miwako and his past actions and soon after the three of them mend their friendship. Hiroyuki is at the top of his class and aspires to become a physician. He eventually falls for Yukari, and foolishly assumed that a girl like her would never show interest in him. In the manga, Hiroyuki expresses his frustration at always being second-best in anything but academics, referring to Miwako choosing Arashi and to Yukari being in love with George, stating that he loves studying just because he can control the outcome. Son of Gokinjo Monogatari character, Hiroaki Tokumori ("Toku-chan").

 
 
 Portrayed by: Natsuki Kato
A former Yazagaku student who is now studying abroad on a scholarship received as the previous winner of the junior Grand Prize. She is noted for her talent and incredible determination. She has romantic feelings for her old friend George, but knows that he is not the type to make a woman happy. According to George's conversation with Yukari, Kaori is the only woman George cannot court and it is hinted that he harbors unique feelings toward her, whether merely those of admiration or romance.

 
 
 Miwako's niece. She is in third grade, and just as perky as Miwako. In the anime, she only makes a brief appearance. Alice has the same eyes as Tsutomu.

Media

Manga 
Written by Ai Yazawa, the chapters of Paradise Kiss appeared as a serial in the Japanese fashion magazine Zipper from 1999 to 2003.

Tokyopop licensed Paradise Kiss for an English-language release in North America and serialized it in its manga magazine Smile. After Tokyopop's dissolving in 2011, New York based publishers Vertical acquired the rights to the property with plans on releasing the series in a three-volume A5 sized set with new covers, color plates and newly commissioned translation  from September 2012 to March 2013. They re-released the series in a single omnibus volume as the "20th Anniversary Edition" on December 3, 2019. Madman Entertainment distributes the series in Australia and New Zealand. The series is also licensed in France by Kana, in Poland by Waneko and in Russia by Comics Factory.

Anime 
Produced by Fuji TV, Aniplex, Dentsu, Shodensha and Madhouse, the Paradise Kiss anime series began airing on October 10, 2005. It was directed by Osamu Kobayashi, who also wrote the series scripts. Nobuteru Yūki served as character designer and chief animation director, while noted fashion creator Atsurō Tayama designed the outfits and THE BABYS and Narasaki (of Coaltar of the Deepers) composed the music. The anime was licensed for release in North America by Geneon Entertainment. On July 3, 2008, Geneon and Funimation Entertainment announced an agreement to distribute select titles in North America. While Geneon will still retain the license, Funimation Entertainment will assume exclusive rights to the manufacturing, marketing, sales and distribution of select titles. Paradise Kiss was one of several titles involved in the deal. Funimation let the license expire in 2011.

The opening theme song is "Lonely in Gorgeous" by Tomoko Kawase (as alter ego Tommy february6). The ending theme features Franz Ferdinand's hit song "Do You Want To". Both songs appear on the Paradise Kiss Original Soundtrack released on December 21, 2005.

Production 
In an interview in the January, 2007 issue of Newtype USA, director Kobayashi revealed many of the personal decisions which went into restructuring the manga into a television series. Wanting to avoid straying too far from the source material without approval, Kobayashi worked closely with Ai Yazawa on the new interpretations of the characters. In many instances, Yazawa was concerned that taking the original material straight would distract casual viewers or worse drive them away. Chief among these concerns was the handling of George's bisexual nature and interest in sadomasochism. Yazawa agreed that the dialogue should reflect this, but that actual onscreen depictions (as can be found in the original manga) were to be avoided. However, Kobayashi felt this was not being entirely true to the character, so he included a few hints of this side of George in the final episode. In another instance of modification, this time brought by Kobayashi, the character design of Arashi was modified to suit a scruffier, less slick appearance. "I wanted to make him look like Lupin the 3rd... sort of slouching and walking around with his hands in his pockets," Kobayashi explained. In agreement with the director, Yazawa went for the change.

One area Yazawa and Kobayashi did not agree on was the casting of Shunsuke Mizutani as Arashi. The fact that he was not a professional voice actor, but rather a musician, was the cause of this debate. Kobayashi had wanted a more natural performance that did not sound like the typical voice acting found in anime. "Yazawa and I even had a few rows because of that," Kobayashi explains. "But after she'd seen about three episodes, she finally admitted that Mizutani's voice is a great match, and I was able to relax."

In relation to the clothing design, despite Tayama's involvement with all of George's outfits, most of the clothing was left largely as originally depicted in the manga. Director Kobayashi had specifically requested a real designer to work on the project, and Tayama's role on the production had originally been conceived as reworking the designs to fit better with the real world, but much to everyone's surprise, the original manga designs by Ai Yazawa were already quite good. So, Tayama mostly was involved in updating the clothes to suit the very latest hot trends, and touching up the designs to make them look and behave realistically when animated. He also provided cloth samples and photographs with all of his illustrations to aid the animators with getting the textures right. Besides George's outfits, the majority of clothing for the other characters was designed by art director and stylist Asami Kiyokawa. After the rough designs were completed, texture artist Yoshikazu Suehiro drew all of the textures and lace by hand, and then scanned them into the computer and digitally applied them as textures during the animation coloring process.

Episode list

Live-action film 

Together with the Japanese production company IMJ, Fox International produced a live-action, Japanese-language film based on Paradise Kiss; The film has an estimated budget of US$3–4 million.

The live-action film features Keiko Kitagawa as Yukari Hayasaka and Osamu Mukai as George. Other cast members are Natsuki Katō as Kaori Aso, Aya Ōmasa as Miwako Sakurada, Kento Kaku as Arashi Nagase, Shunji Igarashi as Isabella Yamamoto, and Yūsuke Yamamoto as Tokumori Hiroyuki.

The film was released in Japan in June 2011.
It featured the songs 'HELLO' and 'YOU' by YUI.

Reception 
Melissa Sternenberg of THEM Anime Reviews called the character designs and animation "fresh and appealing" with the closing and opening sequences "some of the best of the Fall 2005 season," and praised the animation and artwork, especially the fashion designs. However, she felt the series went wrong in cramming the story into 12 episodes, saying 26 episodes would have been better, and said that she disliked the main characters. However, she said that the sentimentality of ParaKiss seems to "accurately reflect the real fashion world".

Carl Kimlinger of Anime News Network had a more positive view, saying that apart from the established characters, the show's true star is the "costume design" which is shown in much detail, with a "delicate balancing of realism with drama." He says that the treatment of this series is "unusually thoughtful," and says the series is "about being young...having dreams...[and] romance," telling the reality of those processes, saying the series will subtly change you. He called the series a "refreshingly mature story" but said it is not for "those in search of reassuring escapism".

References

External links 
 Paradise Kiss Official site from Tokyopop (Archived)
 Paradise Kiss Official site from Zipper magazine  (Archived)
 Paradise Kiss Anime official website 
 Paradise Kiss Official site from Fuji TV  (Archived)
 Paradise Kiss Official site from Aniplex 
 

 
1999 manga
Ai Yazawa
Aniplex
Coming-of-age anime and manga
Fuji TV original programming
Geneon USA
Josei manga
LGBT-related comics
Madhouse (company)
Madman Entertainment manga
Manga adapted into films
Noitamina
Sharp Point Press titles
Shodensha franchises
Shodensha manga
Tokyopop titles
Japanese LGBT-related animated television series
Transgender in anime and manga
Transgender-related television shows
Transgender-related comics
Vertical (publisher) titles
1990s LGBT literature
2000s LGBT literature
2000s LGBT-related drama television series